Alok Nembang was a Nepali film director. He was also a well-known music video director in Nepal for more than a decade.

Career
After returning to Nepal from the United States, where he gained knowledge about theater and film-making, Alok directed over 500 music videos of Nepali music. In an interview he had once stated, "I am inspired by many things and incorporate them on my work but I don't copy". He began his career as a VJ in Image Channel in Nepal in 1998. His debut music video was Lakhau Patak by Nabin K. Bhattarai. Alok acted in the Limbu language film Numafung in 2004. His passion for making films was fulfilled with the production of Sano Sansar (2008), which was a big hit. Alok's second directorial venture Kohi Mero (2010) made him popular among the Nepalese cinema audience. His third film Ajhai Pani was released in February 2015 after his death.

Death
On November 6, 2014, Alok was found dead at his home in Kathmandu in an apparent suicide.

Filmography
 Sano Sansar (2008)
 Kohi Mero (2010)
 Ajhai Pani (2015)

References

1973 births
2014 suicides
Nepalese film directors
People from Kathmandu District
Nepalese expatriates in the United States
Suicides in Nepal
21st-century Nepalese screenwriters
21st-century Nepalese film directors